AAC may refer to:

Aviation
 Advanced Aircraft, a company from Carlsbad, California
 Alaskan Air Command, a radar network
 American Aeronautical Corporation, a company from Port Washington, New York
 American Aviation, a company from Cleveland, Ohio
 Amphibian Airplanes of Canada, a company from Squamish, British Columbia
 El Arish International Airport's IATA code
 Civil Aviation Authority (El Salvador) (Autoridad de Aviación Civil)
 Civil Aviation Authority (Panama) (Autoridad Aeronáutica Civil)

Education
 Anthony Abell College, a secondary school in Brunei
 Art Academy of Cincinnati, a private college
 Association of American Colleges known today as the American Association of Colleges and Universities
 Coimbra Academic Association, a Portuguese students' union

Military
 Anti-Aircraft Warfare
 Advanced Armament Corporation, manufacturer of sound suppressors
 Airborne aircraft carrier, a type of aircraft
 United States Army Acquisition Corps
 United States Army Air Corps, a former component of the United States Army
 Army Air Corps (United Kingdom), a component of the British Army
 Army Apprentices College, a former UK college
 Australian Air Corps, immediate predecessor of the Royal Australian Air force
 Australian Army Cadets, a youth organisation

Organizations
 Adult Association of Canada, a coalition of strip club owners and their agents
 Affirming Anglican Catholicism, a religious movement
 Alameda Arts Council
 American Anglican Council, a religious organization
 Australian Agricultural Company, a company
 Australian Aluminium Council, an industry association

Sports
 American Airlines Center, a multipurpose arena in Dallas, Texas
 American Alpine Club, a climbing organization
 American Athletic Conference, an NCAA college conference made up of primarily Big East Conference teams before 2013
 Appalachian Athletic Conference, an NAIA college athletics conference
 Western North Carolina Athletic Conference, a high school organization known as the Appalachian Athletic Conference until 2009
 Asia-Pacific Amateur Championship, formerly Asian Amateur Championship, an APGC golf tournament
 Associação Académica de Coimbra – O.A.F., a Portuguese football organization
 Associação Académica de Coimbra – basketball, a Portuguese basketball club
 Associação Académica de Coimbra – volleyball, a Portuguese volleyball club
 Associação Académica de Coimbra, the students' union of the University of Coimbra, which sponsors other sports, including rugby 
 Association of Alabama Camps, a youth camp organization
 Atlanta Athletic Club, a private athletic club in Duluth, Georgia
 Audax Alpine Classic, a bicycle event in Victoria, Australia

Technology
 Advanced Audio Coding, an audio compression format, with the .aac file extension
 Air arc cutting, a gouging process for metals
 Auto Avio Costruzioni 815, a car by Ferrari
 Autoclaved aerated concrete, a building material
 Photochrom, also known as the Aäc process

Other uses
 Anesthesiologist assistant (sometimes abbreviated AA-C), an assistant to an anesthesiologist
 Anne Arundel County, Maryland
 Antimicrobial Agents and Chemotherapy, an academic journal
 Ari language (New Guinea), coded aac in ISO 639-3
 Augmentative and alternative communication, a class of communications methods for people with speech impairments
 Pseudomembranous colitis, also known as antibiotic associated colitis, a medical complication
 AAC, a codon for the amino acid asparagine
 Adenine nucleotide translocator (ANT), also known as the ADP/ATP carrier protein (AAC)